Michael Massey (born April 9, 1947), professionally known as Mike Massey, is an American professional pool player From 1989 to 1991 he served as a contributing editor of The Snap Magazine. Massey was born in Loudon, Tennessee, and for several years lived in Chattanooga, Tennessee, where he owned a pool hall. He has the nickname of "Tennessee Tarzan", but he now lives in Midway, Utah.

Massey was inducted into the Hall of Fame of the Billiard Congress of America on April 7, 2005. For 2007 he was ranked as #8 in Pool & Billiard Magazine's poll of the "Fans' Top 20 Favorite Players".

World Trickshot Championship
In 1991, Massey took part in the inaugural World Trickshot Championship in the United Kingdom and despite not winning the event, demonstrated his skills in a special "duel" against the former World Snooker Champion Steve Davis before a live audience, hosted by TV personality Jeremy Beadle.
Massey used props and illusion as an integral part of his routine, such as two balls bonded together, magic props and card tricks. In the words of the 1991 World Trickshot Champion Terry Griffiths: "I feel quite embarrassed to have won actually; Mike Massey is miles ahead of the rest of us. I think it was maybe a touch of nerves that put him off tonight." Massey would go on to win the event in later years.

Massey was also notable for his ability to pick up twice as many pool balls using only one hand than anyone else, a skill he claimed had won him many bets. During the aforementioned Duel with Steve Davis, he managed to pick up 8 balls, with Davis managing to pick up 5. Massey stated that the smaller snooker balls (as compared to U.S. pool balls) made the task more difficult rather than easier. Massey was able to achieve his total of 8 balls by holding a ball between each finger, then picking up 3 more using his palm and thumb muscle.

Titles
2008 World Cup of Trick Shots 
2006 Trick Shot Magic Championship
2005 Billiard Congress of America Hall of Fame
2005 WPA World Artistic Pool Championship
2005 World Snooker Trickshot Championship
2004 Trick Shot Magic Championship
2003 Trick Shot Magic Championship
2003 WPA World Artistic Pool Championship
2002 BCA North American Artistic Pool Championship
2002 WPA World Artistic Pool Championship
2001 Trick Shot Magic Championship
2000 BCA North American Artistic Pool Championship
2000 World Pool Masters Trick Shot Challenge
2000 WPA World Artistic Pool Championship
2000 Trick Shot Magic Championship
1997 World Snooker Trickshot Championship
1997 Senior Nine-ball Masters Championship
1996 Mosconi Cup
1996 Dutch National Eight-ball Championship
1993 World Snooker Trickshot Championship
1984 Sylacauga Open 9-Ball
1982 Classic Cup 9-Ball

Achievements
High runs of 9 racks of nine-ball in tournament play, and 13 racks in challenge match play
High run of 224 balls in straight pool
11,230 balls pocketed in marathon shooting (24 hours)
8,090 balls pocketed in marathon shooting with one arm
World record for most racks of nine-ball run in 24-hour period: 330 racks on live television in Austria

References

1947 births
Living people
American pool players
Trick shot artists
Place of birth missing (living people)
People from Loudon, Tennessee
People from Chattanooga, Tennessee
People from Midway, Utah